Heiner Gembris (born 13 July 1954) is a German musicologist  with a focus on music psychology.

Life and career 
Born in Paderborn, Gembris studied school music at the Hochschule für Musik Detmold as well as German Studies and musicology at the Free University Berlin and the Technical University Berlin. After his doctorate in 1985 and several years of teaching at a Berlin grammar school, he worked as a research assistant at the Technical University of Berlin. From 1996 to 2001, he was an Academic Councilor in music education at the University of Augsburg. At the Westfälische Wilhelms-Universität (1991 to 1997) and the Martin-Luther-University Halle-Wittenberg (1996-2001), he held a professorship for systematic musicology. Since April 2001, Gembris has been professor of music, empirical music education and music psychology at the University of Paderborn and Director of the Institute for Research on Giftedness in Music (IBFM). His main areas of work include musical talent and development in a lifetime perspective, music reception and the effects of music.

References

External links 
 

German musicologists
Academic staff of Paderborn University
Academic staff of the University of Münster
Academic staff of the Martin Luther University of Halle-Wittenberg
1954 births
Living people
People from Paderborn